Milovan is a Slavic name derived from the passive adjective milovati ("caress"). It is recorded in Serbia since the Late Middle Ages. Variants include Milovanac and Milovanče.

Given name
 Milovan Bojić (born 1955), Serbian politician
 Milovan Ćirić (1918–1986), Serbian football manager
 Milovan Đilas (1911–1995), Montenegrin-Serbian Communist politician, theorist and author in Yugoslavia
 Milovan Đorić (born 1945), Serbian football player and manager
 Milovan Danojlić (born 1937), Serbian writer
 Milovan Destil Marković (born 1957), visual artist
 Milovan Drašković (born 1995), Montenegrin basketball player
 Milovan Drecun (born 1957), Serbian journalist of Montenegrin descent
 Milovan Gavazzi (1895–1992), Croatian ethnologist
 Milovan Glišić (1847–1908), Serbian writer, dramatist, and literary theorist
 Milovan Ilic Minimaks (1938–2005), Serbian radio and TV journalist
 Milovan Jakšić (1909–1953), Serbian footballer
 Milovan Jović (1955–2009), Serbian footballer
 Milovan Kapor (born 1991), Canadian soccer player
 Milovan Krivokapić (born 1949), Serbian politician
 Milovan Milovanović (1863–1912), Serbian politician, diplomat and constitutional lawyer
 Milovan Milović (born 1980), Serbian footballer
 Milovan Mirosevic (born 1980), Chilean footballer
 Milovan Obradović (born 1956), Serbian footballer
 Milovan Petrovikj (born 1990), Macedonian footballer
 Milovan Minja Prelević (1970–2019), Montenegrin footballer and coach
 Milovan Raković (born 1985), Serbian professional basketball player
 Milovan Rajevac (born 1954), Serbian footballer
 Milovan Savić (born 1953), Croatian middle-distance runner
 Milovan Sikimić (born 1980), Serbian footballer
 Milovan Stanković (born 1969), Serbian writer
 Milovan Stepandić (1954–2020), Serbian basketball coach
 Milovan Vesnić ( 2014), Serbian racing driver
 Milovan Vidaković (1780–1841), Serbian writer
 Milovan Vitezović (born 1944), Serbian writer, poet, play writer and satirist
 Milovan Zoričić (1884–1971), Croatian football official and criminal judge
 Milovan Zoričić (statistician) (1850–1912), Croatian statistician

Surname 
 Berndt Lubich von Milovan, Hauptsturmführer in the Waffen SS during World War II
 Irena Milovan (1937–2020), Yugoslav ballet dancer
 Ivan Milovan (born 1940), Croatian Roman Catholic prelate

Place names 
 Milovan, a village in Pleșoi Commune, Dolj County, Romania

See also 
 Milovanov
 Milovanović
 Miloslav, "Mila"
 Slavic names

References

Sources

Bosnian masculine given names
Serbian masculine given names
Slovene masculine given names
Croatian masculine given names
Montenegrin masculine given names
Ukrainian masculine given names
Bulgarian masculine given names
Slavic masculine given names
Masculine given names